Industrial Junkie is a British documentary television series. The series premiered on 1 October 2009 on Quest in the United Kingdom. Each episode sees engineering enthusiast Jonny Smith experiencing the processes of a particular industry.

Episodes
Season 1, Episode 1: Roads
Season 1, Episode 2: Rubber
Season 1, Episode 3: Explosives
Season 1, Episode 4: Coal
Season 1, Episode 5: Trucks
Season 1, Episode 6: Oil Rigs
Season 1, Episode 7: Glass
Season 1, Episode 8: Paint
Season 1, Episode 9: Packaging
Season 1, Episode 10: Steel

See also
Modern Marvels
How It's Made
How Do They Do It?
Cool Stuff: How It Works
HowStuffWorks
Some Assembly Required
How'd That Get On My Plate?

External links
 Official Website

2009 British television series debuts
Discovery Channel original programming
2009 British television series endings